Toonen may refer to:

People
 Arne Toonen (born 1975), Dutch film director
 Rik Toonen (born 1954), Dutch water polo player

Legal
 Toonen v. Australia, 1994 human rights case in Australia